Aparna Das (born 10 September 1995) is an Indian actress who acts mainly in Malayalam and Tamil films. She made her acting debut in 2018 through Njan Prakashan.

Early life 
Aparna was born on 10 September 1995 to Malayali parents settled in Muscat, Oman. She completed her primary education from Gangothri English Medium School, Nenmara and Indian School, Darsait. She is a graduate from Sri Krishna Arts and Science College, Coimbatore. After completing her Post-Graduation degree, she worked as an accountant. She had also worked as model for establishments and magazines during and after her studies.

Career 
While working in Muscat after completing her master’s in business administration, Aparna was cast in the satirical comedy film Njan Prakashan (2018) by Sathyan Anthikad, after he watched one of her TikTok videos thus making her debut in Malayalam cinema. Later she played the female lead in Manoharam (2019) opposite Vineeth Sreenivasan. Aparna appeared in the Tamil film Beast (2022) and  appear in 
Priyan Ottathilanu (2022).

Filmography

Films

Music videos

References

External links 
 
 
 

Living people
1995 births
Indian film actresses
Actresses in Malayalam cinema
Actresses in Tamil cinema
21st-century Indian actresses
People from Palakkad district